The Toyota G16E engine is a  straight-three engine built by Toyota under its Gazoo Racing division that was first introduced in January 2020 for the GR Yaris.

Models

G16E-GTS 
The G16E-GTS is a turbocharged engine model with 10.5:1 compression ratio and D-4ST direct/port injection system with multi-oil jet piston cooling, large-diameter exhaust valves and a part-machined intake port.

Applications:
 2020–present GR Yaris (GXPA16)
 2022–present GR Corolla (GZEA14)

Hydrogen fueled version 
In 2021, the Toyota Motor Company announced, that a team of engineers modifies the 1.6L GR Yaris Engine to run exclusive on Hydrogen Fuel as so called Hydrogen Internal Combustion Engine. Since 2021, the modified engine is hardly tested in the Motorsport Event "Super Taikyu race series". The Engine can run on Hydrogen as Fuel with success. Toyota try to establish Hydrogen as zero-emission fuel alternative to gasoline in motorsport and dailydrivers. In 2023 toyota showcases it's Toyota Cross H2 concept vehicle.

Others 

See also 
 Toyota Dynamic Force engine
 List of Toyota engines

References 

G16E
Straight-three engines
Gasoline engines by model